Boccia at the 2016 Summer Paralympics was held in Riocentro, in the Barra district of Rio de Janeiro in September 2016, with a maximum of 104 athletes (24 women, 80 gender unspecified) competing in seven events. The programme consisted of four individual events, two pairs events, and one team event, spread across four classifications.

Classification

When competing in boccia at national or international level, the athletes were competing in events with different classifications, based on level of physical disability.

 BC1 - Cerebral palsy.
Locomotor dysfunction affecting the whole body.
Use hands or feet to propel the ball into play
May be assisted by an aide.
 BC2 - Cerebral palsy.
Locomotor dysfunction affecting the whole body
Use hands to propel the ball into play
Not assisted by an aide.
 BC3 - Cerebral palsy or another disability.
Locomotor dysfunction in all four limbs.
Use the help of a ramp to propel the ball into play.
Assisted by an aide (ramper).
 BC4 - Not cerebral palsy, but another disability, for example muscular dystrophy or tetraplegia.
Locomotor dysfunction in all four limbs
Use hands to propel the ball into play
Not assisted by an aide.

Events

All events in boccia are mixed gender. there are four individual events, two pairs events and a combined classification team event.

Qualification
An NPC can enter one BC1/BC2 Team consisting of four athletes of which a minimum of one must be in the BC1 sport class. An NPC can enter one BC3 Pair consisting of three athletes. An NPC can enter one BC4 Pair consisting of three athletes.

The number of female athletes representing an NPC must be:
 - at least one female athlete for NPCs qualifying one Team or Pair;
 - at least two female athletes for NPCs qualifying two or three Team/Pairs.

An NPC can enter a maximum of three athletes in each of the Individual medal events.

Qualified teams

Competition schedule

Competition lasts from 10 to 16 September. Each day , contains a morning and afternoon session.

Participating nations
103 athletes from 23 nations competed.

Medal summary

The Boccia tournament in Rio 2016 was dominated by the traditional Asian powers, with four golds, three of the four individual titles, and nine medals in total, shared between Thailand, South Korea and Hong Kong. Great Britain took the other individual gold in the Individual BC1 class through David Smith, while Slovakia and hosts Brazil shared the two pairs titles on offer.

Medalists

Medal table

References

External links
- Rankings at CPISRA

 
2016
2016 Summer Paralympics events
2016 in bowls